Beerman is a surname. Notable people with the surname include:

 Albert Christiaan Willem Beerman (1901–1967), Dutch politician
 Coert Beerman (born 1955), Dutch businessman 
 Leonard Beerman (1921–2014), American Rabbi
 Miriam Beerman (1923–2022), American painter and printmaker
 Myles Beerman (born 1999), Maltese footballer

See also

 Berman
 Elder-Beerman, American chain of department stores